Sound-G is the third studio album by South Korean girl group Brown Eyed Girls. The album was released on July 21, 2009.

Concept
Due to the various girl groups that debuted and succeeded in 2009 with a cute concept, Brown Eyed Girls felt that having a cute and innocent concept would work against them.  According to a Neganetwork representative, "the girls will be going through a radical 180° image transformation, making them to be more outgoing girls. Brown Eyed Girls will be transforming themselves with city girls concept in mind, more mature and sexy."

Release and promotion
The lead single Abracadabra was hugely successful. The song was released to various digital outlets in July 2009, after which it quickly topped various online charts.  The song also won the "Mutizen Song" award on SBS's Inki Gayo music program. The song also won a "Best Dance/Electronic song of the year" in the 2010 Korean Music Awards. By the end of 2009 the song was downloaded 3,095,468 times becoming one of the best-selling singles in that year. In December 2011 it was reported that the song actually is one of the biggest hits in the South Korean music history, with a huge popularity in Asia and 4,986,293 downloads in South Korea alone.

Later on, the group revealed a repackaged version of the album titled Sign that included a new single, "Sign", along with "Drunk On Sleep" and a remix of their previous hit "Abracadabra". The repackaged album was released along with the music video for "Sign". The music video caused controversy because of its content. It featured scenes of violence and death, including Ga-In drowning in a tank of water.

The quartet has been readying for their Japan debut since signing with major record label Sony Music Japan International. In August 2010, the group re-released Sound G in Japanese to promote them in the country, which indeed marks the beginning of their Japanese promotions.

Track listing

Sales and certifications

Release history

References

External links
 
 
 

2009 albums
Korean-language albums
Brown Eyed Girls albums